Dirang Moloi (born 28 November 1985) is a Botswana international footballer, who plays for Botswana club Gaborone United in the Botswana Premier League.

Career 
Moloi started his senior career 2005 with Notwane FC in Gaborone. After four and a half year left Notwane and signed for Mochudi Centre Chiefs.

In 2010 the midfielder was loaned to Vasco da Gama of the South African Premier Soccer League. In April 2011 he returned to his club Mochudi Centre Chiefs.

In 2017, he signed with Gaborone United in the Botswana Premier League.

International 
Moloi played in eleven games for the Botswana national football team.

Notes

1985 births
Living people
People from Gaborone
Botswana footballers
Botswana international footballers
Mochudi Centre Chiefs SC players
Association football forwards
Notwane F.C. players
Botswana expatriate footballers
Expatriate footballers in the Democratic Republic of the Congo
Vasco da Gama (South Africa) players
Expatriate soccer players in South Africa
CS Don Bosco players
Botswana expatriate sportspeople in South Africa